Sons of the System is the fourth album by Danish metal band Mnemic, released in Europe on 18 January 2010 and in North America on 26 January 2010. This would be Mnemic's last album with members Rune Stigart, Tomas "Obeast" Koefoed and Brian Rasmussen, before they left the band in 2011.

The album was recorded in the band's own studio with producer Tue Madsen, who worked with the band on previous releases Mechanical Spin Phenomena and The Audio Injected Soul.
The band describes the album as "Very eclectic, very diverse, and nothing that you would imagine coming from a band like us. Let's just say it has become more theatrical, more electronic, and just more catchy, as we have put all our focus on writing good songs and not being afraid of experimenting."

Sons of the System sold roughly 600 copies in the United States after its first week of release.

Track listing

Bonus tracks
European version and digipak

United States

Japanese

iTunes-exclusive (in addition to regional bonus tracks)

Credits
 Guillaume Bideau – vocals
 Mircea Gabriel Eftemie – guitar, keyboards
 Rune Stigart – guitar, keyboards
 Tomas Koefoed – bass
 Brian Rasmussen – drums

References

External links
Sons of the System artwork

2010 albums
Mnemic albums
Nuclear Blast albums
Albums produced by Tue Madsen